Olearia teretifolia is a species of flowering plant in the family Asteraceae and is endemic to south-eastern Australia. It is a bushy shrub with lance-shaped, egg-shaped or elliptic leaves arranged in opposite pairs, and white and yellow, daisy-like inflorescences.

Description
The upper surface is sticky or covered with resin glands, the lower surface whitish or yellowish and densely hairy.

Taxonomy
This daisy was first formally described in 1867 by Jacques Labillardière who gave it the name Aster viscosus in his book Novae Hollandiae Plantarum Specimen. In 1867, George Bentham changed the name to Olearia viscosa in Flora Australiensis. The specific epithet (viscosa) means "abounding in bird lime", that is "sticky" or "viscid".

Distribution and habitat
Olearia viscosa grows in forest, mainly in Tasmania where it is widespread and reasonably common, especially in the south of the state, but also in Victoria where it is confined to coastal scrub and the edges of rainforest near Lakes Entrance.

References

Asterales of Australia
viscosa
Flora of Tasmania
Flora of Victoria (Australia)
Taxa named by Jacques Labillardière
Plants described in 1867